Water Valley is an unincorporated community within Mountain View County, Alberta, Canada. Water Valley boasts a small, but thriving commercial sector, along with a number of permanent residents, and is situated close to Winchell Lake, the Little Red Deer River and the Water Valley Golf Course.

Water Valley is also included within the Water Valley / Winchell Lake Rural Neighbourhood of Mountain View County.

Localities in Mountain View County